Universal Soldier III: Unfinished Business is a 1998 American made-for-television science fiction film directed by Jeff Woolnough and starring Matt Battaglia, Chandra West, Jeff Wincott, Richard McMillan, and Burt Reynolds. Like Universal Soldier II: Brothers in Arms, none of the actors or crew of the original returned, but most of the cast and crew from the first sequel are present. In 1999, a theatrical sequel starring Jean-Claude Van Damme again, Universal Soldier: The Return, ignored the plotline of the two sequels.

Plot
Luc Devereaux (Matt Battaglia), a rejected "UniSol" (a superhuman soldier designed to be the perfect killing machine), and journalist Veronica Roberts (Chandra West) travel to Canada to continue their attempts to expose the Universal Soldier unit. After a hostage situation mistakenly leaves Veronica a fugitive, the two escape the city and go into hiding.

Meanwhile, CIA Deputy Director Mentor (Burt Reynolds) and Dr. Walker (Richard McMillan) are in the process of creating a powerful, UniSol clone of Luc's brother, Eric (Jeff Wincott), to assassinate him and Veronica. The program is under section GR-44. Deveraux and Roberts flee to Canada, hoping to find a news outlet that will tell their story as GR-44 is in hot pursuit.

The finale hints at a broad conspiracy involving "sleeper" UniSols planted in every branch of the U.S. government, up to the White House from which a voice impersonating then president Bill Clinton answers Risco's activation signal.

Cast

 Matt Battaglia as Private Luc Deveraux
 Jeff Wincott as Eric Deveraux
 Burt Reynolds as Mentor
 Chandra West as Veronica Roberts
 Richard McMillan as Dr. Walker
 Roger Periard as McNally
 Juan Chioran as Charles Clifton
 Claudette Roche as Grace
 John F.S. Laing as Martin Daniels
 Jovanni Sy as Max
 Aron Tager as John Deveraux
 James Kee as Jasper
 Lloyd Adams as Hugo
 Vince Corazza as Lowell
 Gerry Mendicino as Chief Thorpe
 Dan Duran as Freddie Smith
 Thomas Hauff as General Clancy
 John Stoneham Sr. as Sheriff
 Philip Williams as Scully

Production

Unfinished Business and its predecessor Brothers in Arms were primarily shot in Southern Ontario over 42 days spread between 27 October and 23 December 1997. Downsview Military Base was used as the UniSols' operations center. Both pictures were shot concurrently, with the schedule alternating between scenes from each film. The two films had an aggregate budget of $10.7 million.

The shoot was occasionally disrupted by Canadian seasonal weather. Part III'''s climactic scene, which required a Fairchild C-123 Provider to be flown in from the U.S. due to a shortage of pilots for similar aircraft available in the country, was delayed by a two-day blizzard.

Matt Battaglia's personal friend Burt Reynolds plays main antagonist "Mentor", who was introduced at the end of the previous film. The character's real name (Gerard Risco) is a backronym, as the G.R. prefix found in each UniSol's identifier is revealed to be derived from his initials. In the novelization of the first film's script by Robert Tine, G.R. stood for Grave Registration.

The ending was left open for a potential regular series. Three syndicators had reportedly expressed interest at the time of filming, but it did not materialize.

ReleaseUniversal Soldier III: Unfinished Business premiered on television on The Movie Channel, a sister channel of Showtime, on 24 October 1998. It was released on VHS by Paramount Home Video on 13 July 1999.Unfinished Business received a 2002 DVD release by TVA Films in Canada, as part of a double feature that also includes the previous installment Brothers in Arms.

Some German home video versions of the film are sold as Neu Bearbeitete Fassung (Newly Edited Version), but this merely indicates that they are cut for violence.

Reception
Critical response
Review aggregator Rotten Tomatoes gives Universal Soldier III: Unfinished Business a 0% approval rating based on 4 reviews, with an average rating of 4.4/10.

Among reviewers not referenced by the main aggregators, reception was also poor. VideoHound rated the film one and a half on a scale of zero to four, slightly lower than Part II. Bulletproof Action similarly decreed that "Brothers in Arms was no masterpiece [...] But things still managed to go downhill in Unfinished Business".

In a mild dissent, The Action Elite found the film "awful", albeit "kind of better" than Part II. Moria Reviews also rated the film marginally higher than the previous installment, but still found fault with Jeff Woolnough's "annoyingly posed and affected" direction. Creature Features: The Science Fiction, Fantasy, and Horror Movie Guide gave the picture two stars out of five. TV Guide also gave it two out of five stars. The publication praised West and Battaglia's chemistry, but ultimately felt that the film "[wasn't] great entertainment". Den of Geek called both Unfinished Business'' and its predecessor "flat and as uninspired as you would expect from a made-for-cable spin off".

References

External links
 
 

1998 television films
1998 films
1990s science fiction action films
1990s English-language films
Showtime (TV network) films
Television sequel films
American science fiction action films
Films about the United States Army
Universal Soldier (film series)
Films directed by Jeff Woolnough
1990s American films